Primorsky (masculine), Primorskaya (feminine), or Primorskoye (neuter) may refer to:

Divisions
Primorsky Krai, a federal subject of Russia
Primorsky District, several districts and city districts in Russia
Primorskoye Urban Settlement, several municipal urban settlements in Russia
Primorskaya Oblast, a historical subdivision of the Russian Empire and the early Russian SFSR
Prymorskyi City District (Primorsky City District), a city district of Odessa, Ukraine

Populated places
Primorsky, Russia (Primorskaya, Primorskoye), several inhabited localities in Russia
Prymorskyi (Primorsky), an urban-type settlement in the Autonomous Republic of Crimea, Ukraine

Other
Primorskaya (Saint Petersburg Metro), a station of the St. Petersburg Metro, St. Petersburg, Russia
Primorsky Range, Irkutsk Oblast

See also
Primorsk (disambiguation)
Primorye (inhabited locality), several inhabited localities in Russia
Prymorske (disambiguation)